If You Could Only Cook (1935) is a screwball comedy of mistaken identity starring Herbert Marshall as a frustrated automobile executive and Jean Arthur as a young woman who talks him into posing as her husband so they can land jobs as a butler and a cook.

Plot 
Jim Buchanan (Marshall), wealthy president of Buchanan Motor Company, is engaged to Evelyn Fletcher (Inescort), a bossy socialite who is interested in Jim for his money. When Jim's fellow executives reject his plan to introduce a new automobile design, he decides to take a vacation.

Declaring himself "sick and tired of everything", Jim goes for a walk in the park, where he meets a young woman named Joan Hawthorne (Arthur). Joan is having trouble finding a job and has just been evicted from her apartment. Assuming he is also a job hunter, she asks Jim to pose as her husband so they can apply for a combined job opening for a butler and a cook. Without revealing his true identity, he agrees.

"Mr. and Mrs. Burns" are soon hired by Michael Rossini (Carrillo). She is a good cook; he improves his skills by sneaking away at night and taking lessons from his own butler. He also goes to his office and takes some of his automobile sketches from a safe to show to Joan. Impressed by his designs, on their day off she shows them to an executive with one of Buchanan's competitors, but he recognizes Buchanan's style, leading to her arrest for theft. Having fallen in love with Jim, she refuses to help the police find him.

Meanwhile, Jim has decided to tell Joan who he is. When she misses a lunch date while in jail, he writes her a letter, abandons his butler position, and returns to Evelyn and his life as a businessman. Rossini, who has just organized a bootlegging gang, learns of Jim's trip to the office from his assistant, Flash (Stander), who is suspicious of Jim and has been tailing him. Wanting Joan for himself, he has her bailed out and tells her the truth about Jim.

She reacts by raging against Jim, so Rossini promptly orders his henchmen to kill Jim at his wedding. To ingratiate himself with Joan, he tells her about this, but she declares that she loves Jim after all and begs Rossini to spare his life.

Rossini's men abduct Jim from the wedding as he is about to take his vows, but Rossini arrives before they leave. He and his men take Jim home at gunpoint and fetch a justice of the peace to marry Jim and Joan. Joan refuses and locks herself in her room, but Jim embraces the plan.  Since Rossini's men were seen kidnapping him, he blackmails the gang into persuading her to change her mind. Outside Joan's room, Rossini pretends to argue with Jim, Flash fires his gun in the air, and Jim collapses onto the floor, pretending to be hit. The deception works:  Joan opens the door and rushes to his side.

Cast
Herbert Marshall as Jim Buchanan/Burns
Jean Arthur as Joan Hawthorne/Burns
Leo Carrillo as Mike Rossini
Lionel Stander as Flash, Rossini's right-hand man
Alan Edwards as Bob Reynolds
Frieda Inescort as Evelyn Fletcher
Gene Morgan as Al
Ralf Harolde as Swig
Matt McHugh as Pete
Bess Flowers as Laura
Richard Powell as Chesty

Lawsuit 
In England, Columbia promoted the film as a Frank Capra production. Capra, the top director at the studiowho had been feuding with studio head Harry Cohn over financial and artistic issuessued Columbia for unlawful use of his name. The parties settled, with Capra returning to the studio while getting $100,000 (the number based on a separate dispute over salary) and having one film waived from a contractual five-film obligation.

Reception
The New York Times review was mixed, stating, "the texture of the production is too uneven. It has laughs but lacks pace." The critic praised the performances of Marshall, Carrillo and Stander, but felt that "... Jean Arthur, a genuinely versatile player, could not quite lend the sparkle to the role of the girl which it conceivably deserved."

Writing for The Spectator in 1936, Graham Greene gave the film a negative review. Acknowledging that there were a few scenes and situations which bore "a few agreeable Capra touches", Greene complained that the film would have had "more wit if the main performance [by Marshall] had been less earnest, less conceited, [and] less humourless..."

References

External links 

 
 
 
 

1935 films
1935 romantic comedy films
American romantic comedy films
American screwball comedy films
American black-and-white films
Films directed by William A. Seiter
Films set in New York City
Columbia Pictures films
Films with screenplays by F. Hugh Herbert
1930s American films